Lemon is an unincorporated community located in McLean County, Kentucky, United States. It was also called Whitesburg.
With at least one old house from civil war era.

References

Unincorporated communities in McLean County, Kentucky
Unincorporated communities in Kentucky